The 2019–20 CSA Women's Provincial T20 Competition was the 8th edition of South Africa's provincial Twenty20 cricket tournament. It ran from October 2019 to March 2020, with 16 provincial teams taking part. The tournament was curtailed by the outbreak of the COVID-19 pandemic, with Western Province winning their sixth T20 title based on an adjusted points system.

Competition format
The 16 teams were divided into three divisions: a top division named "Top 6", and two lower divisions, Pools A and B. Teams played each other team in their group once in a round-robin format, with matches played using a Twenty20 format. The winner of the Top 6 group was crowned Champions. Due to the COVID-19 pandemic, the final five matches in the Top 6 league were cancelled. The points given to each team were therefore adjusted to simulate an equal number of matches played.

The tournament ran concurrently with the 2019–20 CSA Women's Provincial League, with matches played either the day before or day after the corresponding encounter between two teams in the one-day tournament. To maintain this link for the following season, promotion and relegation in the Provincial T20 Competition was determined by standings in the Provincial League.

The groups worked on a points system with positions being based on the total points. Points were awarded as follows:

Win: 4 points 
Tie: 3 points 
Loss: 0 points.
Abandoned/No Result: 2 points.
Bonus Point: 1 bonus point available per match.

Teams

Standings

Top 6

Pool A

Pool B

References

CSA Women's Provincial T20 Competition
Domestic cricket competitions in 2019–20
2019–20 South African cricket season
2019 in South African women's sport
2020 in South African women's sport
Cricket events curtailed due to the COVID-19 pandemic